Pelican Islands Ecological Reserve is an ecological reserve located on several islands in  Lake Winnipeg, Manitoba, Canada. It was established in 2001 under the Manitoba Ecological Reserves Act.

See also
 List of ecological reserves in Manitoba
 List of protected areas of Manitoba

References

External links
 Pelican Islands Ecological Reserve, Backgrounder
 iNaturalist: Pelican Islands Ecological Reserve

Protected areas established in 2001
Ecological reserves of Manitoba
Nature reserves in Manitoba
Protected areas of Manitoba